Idaho Legislative District 24 is one of 35 districts of the Idaho Legislature. It is currently represented by Senator Lee Heider, Republican  of Twin Falls, Representative Lance Clow, Republican of  Twin Falls, and Representative Stephen Hartgen, Republican of Twin Falls.

District profile (1984–1992) 
From 1984 to 1992, District 24 consisted of all of Cassia, Jerome, and Minidoka Counties.

District profile (1992–2002) 
From 1992 to 2002, District 24 consisted Jerome County and a portion of Minidoka County.

District profile (2002–2012) 
From 2002 to 2012, District 24 consisted of a portion of Twin Falls County.

District profile (2012–2022) 
District 24 currently consists of a portion of Twin Falls County.

District profile (2022–) 
Beginning in December 2022, District 24 will consist of Camas and Gooding Counties and a portion Twin Falls County.

See also

 List of Idaho Senators
 List of Idaho State Representatives

References

External links
Idaho Legislative District Map (with members)
Idaho Legislature (official site)

24
Twin Falls County, Idaho